The Arab Junior Athletics Championships is an biennial international athletics competition between athletes under the age of 20 (juniors) from Arabic countries. It is organised by the Arab Athletic Association.

If was first held in 1984 – seven years after the inauguration of the senior Arab Athletics Championships. An Arab Youth Athletics Championships was launched twenty years after the junior competition.

Editions

Statistics

Wins by country

All-time medal table 1984–2018

Championships records
Key:

Men

Women

References

External links
 Arab Athletics website

 
Under-20 athletics competitions
Athletics competitions in Asia
Athletics competitions in Africa
Athletics
Recurring sporting events established in 1984
Biennial athletics competitions